Majić or Majic is a South Slavic matronymic surname formed by adding the Slavic diminutive suffix -ić to the feminine given name Maja. There is an alternative origin of the surname, that is almost exclusively tied to the Montenegrins bearing the name. It originated from the Maritime clan of “Maine", near Budva, Montenegro. The original bajraktari (Montenegrin bannerlord) family of Maine used to be called like that because of their height. (Lat. Major - great). Today the remnants of the family can only be traced to the Majić family in Zeta, Montenegro.

Notable people with this surname include:
 Danny Majic (born 1990), Croatian American record producer
 Edita Majić (born 1970), Croatian sister of the Carmelites and former theater and film actress
 Josip Majić (born 1994), Croatian footballer
 Karlo Majić (born 1998), Croatian footballer
 Mirjana Emina Majić (born 1932), Croatian writer, poet and translator
 Mirko Majić (born 1989), Montenegrin handball player
 Vigor Majić, Serbian scientist
 Miodrag Majić (born 1969), Serbian legal scholar, judge and author.
Mrkoje Majić, (born 1752), Montenegrin warlord of Maine, that fought against troops of the First French Republic

References

Croatian surnames
Montenegrin surnames
Matronymic surnames